Central Mall is a shopping mall located in Fort Smith, Arkansas. It opened in 1971 and is anchored by Dillard's and JCPenney. The mall is owned and managed by Namdar Realty Group.

History

Renovation
The mall underwent a major renovation in 1999, which included new flooring, skylights, interior finishes and site lighting. Other improvements include a domed food court with an outside dining area, a seating capacity of 350, and a children's soft play area constructed in 2002.

Sears closure
On January 28, 2018, the mall lost one of its anchor tenants when Sears permanently closed.

Abercrombie & Fitch closure

In late 2020, A&F Announced that it was going to close the doors to many of its locations. Central Mall was one of those locations. The location closed on February 16, 2021.

Anchor tenants
 Dillard's
 JCPenney
 Rustic Cabin

References

External links
Official website

Shopping malls established in 1971
Shopping malls in Arkansas
Buildings and structures in Fort Smith, Arkansas
Tourist attractions in Sebastian County, Arkansas
Namdar Realty Group
1971 establishments in Arkansas